TFA may refer to:
 Task Force Argos, responsible for investigation of online child exploitation and abuse
 Taipei Football Association
 Tata Football Academy, a football (soccer) organisation in India
 Taxpayer First Act, an IRS reform law
 Teach For America, an organization to recruit teachers for public schools
 Technology Futures Analysis, a collective term from futures studies
 Terengganu FA, a Malaysian football club
 Texas Forensic Association, an organization that provides speech and debate competitions for school students
 The Force Awakens, a 2015 Star Wars film
 The Freedom Association, a free-market libertarian advocacy group in the United Kingdom
 Time–frequency analysis, a signal processing approach utilizing both time and frequency components of a signal
 Trade Facilitation Agreement, part of the 2013 WTO Bali Package
 Trans fatty acid
 Trifluoroacetic acid, a strong carboxylic acid
 Trifluoroacetone, a chemical compound
 Two-factor authentication, an approach to verify identity in computer security